During the 1998–99 season, Deportivo de La Coruña competed in La Liga and Copa del Rey.

Summary
Deportivo La Coruña's 1998–99 season included its 29th appearance in La Liga, where it ranked sixth. In the Copa del Rey the team reached the semifinals for the first time since its 1995 title. On the other hand, the team didn't appear in European competitions, for the last time until the 2006–07 season. It was the first season under manager Javier Irureta, who would lead the club highly successfully until 2005.

Squad
Source: BdFútbol

Transfers

Unsuccessful attempts 
 Deportivo was close to sign Barcelona's Juan Antonio Pizzi but the player decided to return to the Argentine Primera División after River Plate rose its initial offer to match Deportivo's, as explained by Pizzi's agent Ricardo Schliepper on June 30.

Competitions

La Liga

League table

Results by round

Matches

Copa del Rey

Third round

Fourth round

Eightfinals

Quarterfinals

Semifinals

Statistics

Players statistics

References

Deportivo de La Coruña
Deportivo de La Coruña seasons